Akhtarul Wasey (born 1 September 1951) is the president of Maulana Azad University, Jodhpur, India, and a former professor of Islamic Studies. He taught at Jamia Millia Islamia (Central University) in New Delhi, where he remains professor emeritus in the Department of Islamic Studies.

Early life and education
Wasey was born on September 1, 1951, in Aligarh, Uttar Pradesh to Hairat bin Wahid and Shahida Hairat. He is the oldest of six children. Wasey attended Primary School No. 16, the City High School of Aligarh Muslim University, and Aligarh Muslim University where he earned a Bachelor of Arts (Hons.) in Islamic studies in 1971, a Bachelor of Theology in 1975, a Master of Theology in 1976, and a Master of Arts in Islamic studies in 1977. He also completed a short-term course in the Turkish language from Istanbul University in 1983.

Career
On August 1, 1980 he joined Jamia Millia Islamia, Delhi as lecturer and worked there till 31 August 2016.Wasey was a lecturer, reader and professor at Jamia Milia Islamia University in New Delhi from 1980-2016, serving as the director of Zakir Husain Institute of Islamic Studies and later becoming head of the Department of Islamic Studies and Dean of the Faculty of Humanities and Languages. He is currently the president of Maulana Azad University in Jodhpur and remains a Professor Emeritus in the Department of Islamic Studies at Jamia Millia Islamia.

In March 2014, Wasey was appointed by Indian President Shri Pranab Mukherjee to a three-year term as Commissioner for Linguistic Minorities in India, and became the first Urdu-speaking commissioner since 1957.

Wasey is the editor of four Islamic journals: Islam Aur Asr-e-Jadeed; Islam and the Modern Age; Risala Jamia; and Islam Aur Adhunik Yug.

Awards and honors
1985 Award from Urdu Academy, Delhi and UP Urdu Academy on "Sir Syed Ki Taleemi Tehreek"
1996 Maulana Mohammad Ali Jauhar Award
2008 Fulbright Fellowship
2013 Padma Shri award from President Pranab Mukherjee of India
2014 Makhdoom Quli Medal from the President of Turkmenistan
2014 Daktur-e-Adab from Jamia Urdu, Aligarh

References

External links
 Faculty page

Living people
21st-century Muslim scholars of Islam
21st-century Indian Muslims
Aligarh Muslim University alumni
1951 births
Recipients of the Padma Shri in literature & education
People from Aligarh
Istanbul University alumni
Academic staff of Jamia Millia Islamia
Scholars from Uttar Pradesh